Robert B. Nichols (born November 17, 1946 – June 24, 2011) was a professional American football linebacker in the National Football League. He attended the University of Tulsa. He competed in football and track for Tulsa. He would play with the Baltimore Colts in 1970 and 1971, and was a member of the Colts' Super Bowl V winning team.

References

External links
Pro-Football-Reference

1946 births
2011 deaths
People from Cleveland, Oklahoma
Baltimore Colts players
Tulsa Golden Hurricane football players
Players of American football from Oklahoma
Tulsa Golden Hurricane men's track and field athletes